Vijesh Prabhudessai (born 20 February 1997) is an Indian cricketer. He made his Twenty20 debut for Goa in the 2017–18 Zonal T20 League on 8 January 2018. He made his List A debut for Goa in the 2017–18 Vijay Hazare Trophy on 6 February 2018. He made his first-class debut for Goa in the 2018–19 Ranji Trophy on 28 November 2018.

References

External links
 

1997 births
Living people
Indian cricketers
Goa cricketers
Place of birth missing (living people)